Mindanao (Jawi: مينداناو) is the second-largest island in the Philippines, after Luzon, and seventh-most populous island in the world. Located in the southern region of the archipelago, the island is part of an island group of the same name that also includes its adjacent islands, notably the Sulu Archipelago. According to the 2020 census, Mindanao has a population of 26,252,442 people, while the entire island group has an estimated population of 27,021,036 according to the 2021 census.

Mindanao is divided into six administrative regions: the Zamboanga Peninsula, Northern Mindanao, the Caraga region, the Davao region, Soccsksargen, and the autonomous region of Bangsamoro. According to the 2020 census, Davao City is the most populous city on the island, with 1,776,949 people, followed by Zamboanga City (pop. 977,234), Cagayan de Oro (pop. 728,402), General Santos (pop. 697,315), Butuan (pop. 372,910), Iligan (pop. 363,115) and Cotabato City (pop. 325,079). About 70% of residents identify as Christian and 24% as Muslim. Mindanao is considered the major breadbasket of the Philippines.

Etymology
The name "Mindanao" is a Spanish corruption of the name of the Maguindanao people, the dominant ruling ethnic group in the Sultanate of Maguindanao in southwestern Mindanao during the Spanish colonial period. The name itself means "people of the lake", though it is usually translated to "people of the flood plains" in modern sources.

History

Prehistory

Archaeological findings on the island point to evidence of human activity dating back about ten thousand years. Around 1500 BC Austronesian people spread throughout the Philippines.

The Subanon are believed to have settled in the Zamboanga Peninsula during the Neolithic Era c. 4500-2000 BC. Evidence of stone tools in Zamboanga del Norte may indicate a late Neolithic presence. Ceramic burial jars, both unglazed and glazed, Chinese celadons, gold ornaments, beads, and bracelets have been found in caves. Many of the ceramic objects are from the Yuan and Ming periods. Evidently, there was a long history of trade between the Subanon and the Chinese long before the latter's contact with Islam.

Rajahnates and Hindu-Buddhism

In the classic epoch of Philippine history (900 AD onwards), the people of Mindanao were heavily exposed to Hindu and Buddhist influence and beliefs from Indonesia and Malaysia. Indianized abugida scripts such as Kawi and Baybayin were introduced from Java and an extinct intermediate from Sulawesi or Borneo respectively. Cultural icons of the sarong (known as malong or patadyong), the pudong turban, silk, and batik and ikat weaving and dyeing methods were introduced. Artifacts found from this era include the Golden kinnara, Golden Tara, and the Ganesh pendant. These cultural traits passed from Mindanao into the Visayas and Luzon, but were subsequently lost or heavily modified after the Spanish arrival in the 16th century.

Hindu-Buddhist cultural influence took root in the coastal settlements, syncretizing with indigenous animist beliefs and customs among the tribes of the interior. The Butuan Rajahnate, a Hinduized kingdom mentioned in Chinese records as a tributary state in the 10th century, was concentrated along the northeastern coast of Butuan Bay. The Rajahnate of Sanmalan in Zamboanga, was also in Mindanao. The Darangen epic of the Maranao people harkens back to this era as the most complete local version of the Ramayana. The Maguindanao at this time also had strong Hindu beliefs, evidenced by the Ladya Lawana (Rajah Ravana) epic saga that survives to the present, albeit highly Islamized from the 17th century onward.

Sultanates and Islam

The spread of Islam in the Philippines began in the 14th century, mostly through the influence of Muslim merchants from the western Malay Archipelago. The first mosque in the Philippines was built in the mid-14th century in the town of Simunul, Tawi-Tawi. Around the 16th century, the Muslim sultanates of Sulu, Lanao and Maguindanao were established from formerly Hindu-Buddhist Rajahnates.

As Islam gained influence in Mindanao, the natives of the Sultanates had to either convert to Islam or pay tribute to their new Muslim rulers. The largest of the Muslim polities in mainland Mindanao was the Sultanate of Maguindanao, which controlled the southern floodplains of the Rio Grande de Mindanao and most of the coastal area of the Illana Bay and the Moro Gulf. The name Mindanao was derived from this Sultanate. But most of Mindanao remained animist, especially the Lumad people in the interior. Most of the northern, eastern, and southern coastal regions inhabited by Visayans (Surigaonon and Butuanon) and other groups were later converted to Christianity by the Spanish. Mindanao was then embroiled between a conflict with the Boholano (Visayan) Kedatuan of Dapitan and the Moluccan Sultanate of Ternate. Dapitan which was originally at Bohol was destroyed by an expeditionary force from the Ternate Sultanate and Dapitenyos were forced to relocate to Northern Mindanao where they waged war against the Sultanate of Lanao and established a new Dapitan there. Mindanaoans then spread out of Mindanao across Southeast Asia, Historian William Henry Scott, quoting the Portuguese manuscript Summa Orientalis, noted that Mottama in Burma (Myanmar) had a large presence of merchants from Mindanao.

Spanish colonization and Christianity

In 1521 Antonio Pigafetta wrote an account of reaching 'Maingdano.' He was with Magellan on the first circumnavigation of the globe and sailing for the king of Spain.

On February 2, 1543, Ruy López de Villalobos was the first Spaniard to reach Mindanao. He called the island "Caesarea Caroli" after Charles V of the Holy Roman Empire (and I of Spain). Shortly after Spain's colonization of Cebu, it moved on to colonize the Caraga region in northeast Mindanao and discovered significant Muslim presence on the island. Over time a number of tribes in Mindanao converted to Roman Catholicism and built settlements and forts throughout the coastal regions. These settlements endured despite attacks from neighboring Muslim sultanates. The most heavily fortified of them, apart from a short period in 1662 when Spain sent soldiers from the city to Manila after a threat of invasion from the Chinese general Koxinga, was Zamboanga City which was settled by soldiers from Peru and Mexico. The sultanates resisted Spanish pressure and attempts to convert them to Christianity during this period. The Papuan-speaking Sultanate of Ternate in the Mollucas at Indonesia formed a close alliance with the sultanates of Mindanao, especially with the Sultanate of Maguindanao. Ternate regularly sent military reinforcements to Mindanao to assist the local sultanates in their war against Spanish-controlled Manila.

By the late 18th century Spain had geographic dominance over the island, having established settlements and forts in most of Mindanao, including Zamboanga City and Misamis Occidental to the northwest, Iligan City, Misamis Oriental, Bukidnon, and Camiguin Island to the north, Surigao and Agusan in the Caraga region to the east, and Davao in the island's gulf coast. Spain continued to engage in battles with Muslim sultanates until the end of the 19th century.

At the same time as the Philippine revolution against Spain, the Republic of Zamboanga rose as a revolutionary state in Mindanao before it was absorbed by the oncoming Americans.

American Occupation and Philippine Commonwealth

In the Treaty of Paris in 1898 Spain sold the entire Philippine archipelago to the United States for $20 million. The 1900 Treaty of Washington and the 1930 Convention Between the United States and Great Britain clarified the borders between Mindanao and Borneo.

In early 1900s the Commonwealth government (Led by Americans) encouraged citizens from Luzon and Visayas to migrate to Mindanao. Consisting mostly of Ilocanos, Cebuanos, and Ilonggos. Settlers streaming into Soccsksargen led to the displacement of the Blaan and Tboli tribes.

World War II
In April 1942 Mindanao, along with the rest of the Philippines, officially entered World War II after Japanese soldiers invaded key cities in the islands. Many towns and cities were burned to the ground in Mindanao, most notably Davao City, Zamboanga City, Lanao, Cagayan de Oro, Iligan City, and Butuan. In the months of April and May 1942, Japanese forces defeated US troops commanded by William F. Sharp and Guy Fort, in a battle that started at Malabang (a town close to Gandamatu Macadar, Lanao) and ended close to the town of Ganassi, Lanao. Davao City was among the earliest to be occupied by the invading Japanese forces. They immediately fortified the city as a bastion of the Japanese defense system.

Davao City was subjected by the returning forces of Gen. Douglas MacArthur to constant bombing before the American Liberation Forces landed in Leyte in October 1944. Filipino soldiers and local guerrilla fighters were actively fighting Japanese forces until liberation at the conclusion of the Battle of Mindanao.

Postwar era and Philippine independence 
Mindanao was peaceful and increasingly progressive in the postwar period, including the 1950s and the mid-1960s. Ethnic tensions were minimal, and there was essentially no presence of secessionists groups in Mindanao.

Marcos era (1965–1986) 

Under Ferdinand Marcos's administration, Christian groups began to settle in Mindanao, displacing many locals. The population boom resulted in conflicts as the original owners sought their ancestral land domains.

The Marcos administration encouraged new settlers who had emigrated to Mindanao to form a militia, which was eventually called the Ilaga. Anecdotal evidence states that the Ilaga often committed human rights abuses by targeting the Moro and Lumad people, as well as attempting to seize additional territory. It resulted in a lingering animosity between Moro and Christian communities. Mistrust and a cycle of violence are still felt today due to the creation of the Ilaga.

The Jabidah massacre in 1968 is commonly cited as the major flashpoint that ignited the Moro insurgency, and the ensuing ethnic tensions led to the formation of secessionist movements, such as the Muslim Independence Movement and the Bangsamoro Liberation Organization. These movements were largely political in nature, but the prohibition of political parties after Marcos' 1972 declaration of Martial Law led to the founding and dominance of armed groups such as the Moro National Liberation Front (MNLF), and the Moro Islamic Liberation Front (MILF). Ethnic conflicts continued to escalate, leading to incidents like the 1971 Manili Massacre, the Pata Island Massacre, and the Palimbang massacre.

Additionally, an economic crisis in late 1969 led to social unrest throughout the country, and violent crackdowns on protests led to the radicalization of many students, with some joining the New People's Army, bringing the  Communist rebellion to Mindanao.

Marcos' declaration led to the shuttering of press outlets - television stations, national newspapers, weekly magazines, community newspapers, and radio stations - throughout the country, including in Mindanao. The remaining years of the Marcos dictatorship led to the killings of many Mindanao Journalists, with prominent examples being Alex Orcullo of Mindanao Currents and Mindaweek, and Jacobo Amatong of the Mindanao Observer.

Fifth Republic (1986–present) 

In 1989, the Autonomous Region in Muslim Mindanao (ARMM) was established, constituted by several provinces in Western Mindanao.

In March 2000, President Joseph Estrada declared an "All Out War" against the MILF after it committed a series of terrorist attacks on government buildings, civilians, and foreigners. A number of livelihood intervention projects, from organisations such as USAID and the Emergency Livelihood Assistance Program (ELAP), aided in the reconstruction of areas affected by constant battles on the island.

In December 2009, President Gloria Macapagal Arroyo officially placed Maguindanao under a state of martial law following the Maguindanao massacre.

Tropical storm Sendong (international name, Washi) made landfall on December 15, 2011, in Mindanao. The recorded 24-hour rainfall in Lumbia station of PAGASA reached 180.9 mm, causing the overflow of the Cagayan de Oro River. The storm killed 1,268 people, with 49 others listed as missing. Most of the casualties were from Cagayan de Oro and Iligan. Those who survived were rendered homeless, seeking shelter in evacuation centers.

On September 9, 2013, an MNLF faction attempted to raise the flag of a self-proclaimed Bangsamoro Republik at Zamboanga City Hall in an armed incursion into parts of the city.

On January 25, 2015, a shootout took place during a police operation by the Special Action Force (SAF) of the Philippine National Police (PNP) in Tukanalipao, Mamasapano, Maguindanao. The operation, codenamed Oplan Exodus, was intended to capture or kill wanted Malaysian terrorist and bomb-maker Zulkifli Abdhir and other Malaysian terrorists or high-ranking members of the Bangsamoro Islamic Freedom Fighters (BIFF).

In May 2017, President Rodrigo Duterte declared martial law on the entire island group of Mindanao following the Marawi siege by the Maute terrorist group. More than 180,000 people were forced to evacuate Marawi City. Around 165 security forces and 47 residents were confirmed killed in the battle, although Marawi residents believe the number of civilians killed was far higher. The official death toll in the five-month war is 1,109, most of which were members of a militant alliance which drew fighters from radical factions of domestic Islamist groups.

In 2019, the Bangsamoro Autonomous Region in Muslim Mindanao was established, replacing the former ARMM.

Economy

Mindanao's economy accounts for 14% of the country's gross domestic product. The region grew 4.9% in 2016 against Luzon's 5.5% and Visayas' 9.1%.

Agriculture, forestry and fishing make up more than 40% of Mindanao's market, being the country's largest supplier of major crops such as pineapples and bananas.

There is one defined growth corridor in the island, namely Metro Davao. Other regional centers are: Cagayan de Oro, General Santos, Zamboanga City, Cotabato City, and Pagadian City.

Being the top-performing economy in Mindanao, Davao Region has the 5th-biggest economy in the country and the second-fastest-growing economy next to Cordillera Autonomous Region. While the region's economy is predominantly agri-based, it is now developing into a center for agro-industrial business, trade and tourism. Its competitive advantage is in agri-industry as its products, papayas, mangoes, bananas, pineapples, fresh asparagus, flowers, and fish products are exported internationally. The region can be a vital link to markets in other parts of Mindanao, Brunei Darussalam and parts of Malaysia and Indonesia.

There is also a growing call center sector in the region, mostly centered in Davao City.

Upcoming developments 
Some 2,130 government-led infrastructure projects worth P547.9 billion have also been lined up for Mindanao until 2022.

NEDA official said that 68% of that budget will be allotted for the transportation sector, while 16% will go to water resources, and 6% to social infrastructure.

Of this amount, 18 infrastructure projects have been identified as "flagship projects," five of them have already been approved by President Rodrigo Duterte.

The projects include the ₱35.26 billion Tagum-Davao-Digos Segment of the Mindanao Railway, the ₱40.57 billion Davao airport, the ₱14.62 billion Laguindingan airport, the ₱4.86 billion Panguil Bay Bridge Project, and the ₱5.44 billion Malitubog-Maridagao Irrigation Project, Phase II.

Projects in the pipeline are the second and third phases of the Mindanao Railway; the Agus-Pulangi plant rehabilitation; the Davao expressway; the Zamboanga Fish Port Complex rehabilitation; the Balo-i Plains Flood Control Project; Asbang Small Reservoir Irrigation Project; the Ambal Simuay Sub-Basin of the Mindanao River Basin Flood Control and River Protection Project; as well as the Road Network Development Project in Conflict-Affected Areas in Mindanao project.

Administrative divisions

The island consists of six administrative regions, 23 provinces, and 30 cities (27 provinces and 33 cities if associated islands are included).

Largest cities and municipalities in Mindanao
The list of largest cities and municipalities in Mindanao in terms of population is shown in the table below.

Geography

The island is mountainous, and is home to Mount Apo, the highest mountain in the country. Mindanao is surrounded by four seas: the Sulu Sea to the west, the Philippine Sea to the east, the Celebes Sea to the south, and the Mindanao Sea to the north.

The island itself is part of an island group of the same name, which includes the Sulu Archipelago and the outlying islands of Camiguin, Dinagat, Siargao, and Samal.

Mountains 

The mountains of Mindanao can be grouped into ten ranges, including both complex structural mountains and volcanoes. The structural mountains on the extreme eastern and western portions of the island show broad exposures of Mesozoic rock, and Ultrabasic rocks at the surface in many places along the east coast. Other parts of the island consist mainly of Cenozoic and Quaternary volcanic or sedimentary rocks.

In the eastern portion of the island, from Bilas Point in Surigao del Norte to Cape San Agustin in Davao Oriental, is a range of complex mountains known in their northern portion as the Diwata Mountains. This range is low and rolling in its central portion. The southern portion of this range is broader and even more rugged than the northern section.

The east-facing coastal regions of Davao and Surigao del Sur are marked by a series of small coastal lowlands separated from each other by rugged forelands which extend to the water's edge. Offshore are numerous coral reefs and tiny islets. This remote and forbidding coast is made doubly difficult to access during the months from October to March by the heavy surf driven before the northeast trade winds. A few miles offshore is found the Philippine Deep.

A second north–south mountain range extends from Talisayan in the north, to Tinaca Point in the southernmost point of Mindanao. This mountain range runs along the western borders of the Agusan del Norte, Agusan del Sur, and Davao provinces. This range is mainly structural in origin, but it also contains at least three active volcano peaks.

Mount Apo is the highest point in the Philippines. South of Mount Apo, this central mountain belt is somewhat lower than it is to the north, with peaks averaging only .

In Western Mindanao, a range of complex structural mountains forms the long, hand-like Zamboanga Peninsula. These mountains, reaching heights of only , are not as high as the other structural belts in Mindanao. There are several places in the Zamboanga Mountains where small inter-mountain basins have been created, with some potential for future agricultural development. Batorampon Point is the highest mountain of the southernmost end of the peninsula, reaching a height of only ; it is located in the boundary of Zamboanga City.

A series of volcanic mountains is located within the vicinity of Lake Lanao forming a broad arc through the Lanao del Sur, Cotabato and Bukidnon provinces. At least six of the twenty odd peaks in this area are active and several stand in semi-isolation. The Butig Peaks, with their four crater lakes, are easily seen from Cotabato.

In South Cotabato, is another range of volcanic mountains, this time paralleling the coast. Mount Matutum is a protected area and is considered one of the major landmarks in the South Cotabato province.

Plateaus 
Another important physiographic division of Mindanao is the series of upland plateaus in the Bukidnon and Lanao del Sur provinces. These plateaus are rather extensive and almost surround several volcanoes in this area. The plateaus are made up of basaltic lava flows inter-bedded with volcanic ash and tuff. Near their edges, the plateaus are cut by deep canyons, and at several points waterfalls drop down to the narrow coastal plain. These falls hold considerable promise for development of hydroelectric energy. Indeed, one such site at Maria Cristina Falls has already become a major producer. The rolling plateaus lie at an elevation averaging 700 meters above sea level, and offer relief from the often oppressive heat of the coastal lowlands.

Lakes and waterfalls 
Lake Lanao occupies a large portion of one such plateau in Lanao del Sur. This lake is the largest lake in Mindanao and the second largest in the country; it is roughly triangular in shape with an  base, having a surface at 780 meters above sea level, and is rimmed on the east, south, and west by a series of peaks reaching 2,300 meters. Marawi City, at the northern tip of the lake, is bisected by the Agus River, that feeds the Maria Cristina Falls.

Here the Jose Abad Santos Falls present one of the nation's scenic wonders at the gateway to a 200-hectare national park development.

Valleys, rivers, and plains 

Mindanao contains two large lowland areas in the valleys of the Agusan River in Agusan, and the Rio Grande de Mindanao in Cotabato City.

There is some indication that the Agusan Valley occupies a broad syncline between the central mountains and the east-coast mountains. The elevation of this divide is well under , indicating the almost continuous nature of the lowland from the Mindanao Sea on the north to Davao Gulf.

The southern extensions of this Cotabato Valley extend uninterrupted across a  watershed from Illana Bay on the northwest to Sarangani Bay on the southeast.

Other lowlands of a coastal nature are to be found in various parts of Mindanao. Many of these are tiny isolated pockets, along the northwest coast of Zamboanga.

From Dipolog, eastward along the northern coast of Mindanao approaching Butuan, extends a rolling coastal plain of varying width. In Misamis Occidental, the now dormant Mount Malindang has created a lowland averaging  in width. Shallow Panguil Bay divides this province from Lanao del Norte, and is bordered by low-lying, poorly drained lowlands and extensive mangroves. In Misamis Oriental, the plain is narrower and in places whittle into rugged capes that reach the sea. East of Cagayan de Oro, a rugged peninsula extends into the Mindanao Sea.

Climate change 
Climate change is expected to have adverse effects on Mindanao's population, environment, and agriculture. Mindanao is already experiencing severe climate events attributed to changes in the earth's temperature. These climate events include typhoons such as Typhoon Washi, Typhoon Bopha and Typhoon Rai in December 2021. Those storms had severe impact on the Island of Mindanao.

Demographics
As of 2017, Mindanao had a population of over 25 million people. This comprises 22.1 percent of the entire population of the country.

Ethnicity and culture

An American census conducted in the early 1900s noted that the island was inhabited by people "greatly divided in origin, temperament and religion". Evidence of the island's cultural diversity can be seen in the buildings and ruins of old Spanish settlements in the northwestern peninsula that span eastwards to the southern gulf coast, the site of the ancient Rajahnate of Butuan in the northeast region (Caraga), the Sultanates in the southwest (Sultanate of Sulu, Sultanate of Lanao, Sultanate of Maguindanao), a number of Buddhist and Taoist temples, and the numerous indigenous tribes.

Today around 25.8 percent of the household population in Mindanao classified themselves as Cebuanos. Other ethnic groups included Bisaya/Binisaya (18.4%), Hiligaynon/Ilonggo (8.2%), Maguindanaon (5.5%), and Maranao (5.4%). The remaining 36.6 percent belonged to other ethnic groups. Cebuano registered the highest proportion of ethnic group in Northern Mindanao and Davao Region with 35.59 percent and 37.76 percent, respectively. In Soccsksargen, it was Hiligaynon/Ilonggo (31.58%), Binisaya/Bisaya (33.10%) in Zamboanga Peninsula, Maranao (26.40%) in ARMM, and Surigaonon (25.67%) in Caraga.

Languages 

Dozens of languages are spoken in Mindanao; among them, Cebuano, Hiligaynon, Surigaonon, Tausug, Maranao, Maguindanao, and Chavacano are most widely spoken. Of the seven aforementioned regional languages, Cebuano (often referred as Bisaya) has the highest number of speakers, being spoken throughout Northern Mindanao (except the southern parts of Lanao del Norte), the Davao region, the western half of the Caraga region (as well as the city of Bislig and the municipalities surrounding it in Surigao del Sur), the entirety of the Zamboanga Peninsula (with the exception of Zamboanga City), and southern Soccsksargen. Hiligaynon is the main language of Soccsksargen, where majority of the inhabitants are of ethnic Hiligaynon stock. Surigaonon is spoken in the eastern half of the Caraga region, mainly by the eponymous Surigaonons. Tausug is widely spoken in the western territories of the ARMM, specifically the Sulu Archipelago, which comprises the provinces of Basilan, Sulu, and Tawi-Tawi, with a sizeable community of speakers residing in Zamboanga City. Maguindanao and Maranao are the dominant languages of the eastern territories of the ARMM, respectively, with the former being spoken in Lanao del Sur as well as the southern areas of Lanao del Norte, and the latter in the eponymous province of Maguindanao and also in adjacent areas which are part of Soccsksargen. Chavacano is the native language of Zamboanga City and is also the lingua franca of Basilan; it is also spoken in the southernmost fringes of Zamboanga Sibugay. It is also spoken, albeit as a minority language, in Cotabato City and Davao City, where dialects of it, respectively, exist, namely Cotabateño and Castellano Abakay, both of which evolved from the variant of the language spoken in Zamboanga City. English is also widely understood and spoken, being highly utilized in business and academia.

Religion

Roman Catholicism is the dominant religious affiliation in Mindanao with 65.9% of the household population, majority of which are adherents of Roman Catholicism, Islam comprised 23.39%, and other religions were Pentecostal (5.34%), Aglipayan (2.16%), and Iglesia ni Cristo (2.66%).

Tourism 
Major tourist spots are scattered throughout Mindanao, consisting mostly of beach resorts, scuba diving resorts, surfing, museums, nature parks, mountain climbing, and river rafting. Siargao, best known for its surfing tower in Cloud 9, also has caves, pools, waterfalls, and lagoons. There are archaeological sites, historical ruins, and museums in Butuan. White Island is a popular tourist spot in Camiguin. The Duka Bay and the Matangale dive resorts in Misamis Oriental offer glass bottomed boat rides and scuba diving lessons. Cagayan de Oro has beach resorts, the Mapawa Nature Park, white water rafting and kayaking, museums, and historical landmarks. Ziplining is the main attraction at the Dahilayan Adventure Park and rock wall climbing at Kiokong in Bukidnon. Iligan City has the Maria Cristina Falls, Tinago Falls, nature parks, beaches, and historical landmarks. There are parks, historical buildings, the Vinta Ride at Paseo del Mar, boat villages, 11 Islands (commonly called as Onçe Islas), 17th-century Fort Pilar Shrine & Museum and the world-renowned Pink Sand Beach of Sta. Cruz in Zamboanga City. There are festivals, fireworks, and the Beras Bird Sanctuary in Takurong City. Davao has Mt Apo, parks, museums, beaches, historical landmarks, and scuba diving resorts.

Energy

Many areas in Mindanao suffer rotating 12-hour blackouts due to the island's woefully inadequate power supply. The island is forecast to continue suffering from a 200-megawatt power deficit until 2015, when the private sector begins to operate new capacity. Aboitiz Equity Ventures, a publicly listed holdings company, has committed to supplying 1,200 megawatts through a coal-fired plant on the border of Davao City and Davao del Sur that is slated for operation by 2018. The Agus-Pulangui hydropower complex, which supplies more than half of Mindanao's power supply, is currently producing only 635 megawatts of its 982 megawatt capacity due to the heavy siltation of the rivers that power the complex. Zamboanga City, an urbanized center in southwest Mindanao, is expected to begin experience daily three-hour brownouts due to the National Power Corporation's decision to reduce power supply in the city by 10 megawatts.

The Manila Electric Company (Meralco), the largest power distributor in the Philippines, and Global Business Power Corp (GBPC), also a major provider, have announced plans to enter Mindanao for the first time to establish solutions for the power problems within the island.

Major annual events  
 Mindanao Film Festival (Established in 2003)
 Kadayawan Festival
 Kaamulan Festival
 Christmas Symbols Festival
 Bangsamoro Short Film Festival

See also

 Geography of the Philippines
 Island groups of the Philippines
 List of islands in the Philippines
 Luzon
 Visayas

References

External links

 
 Mindanao Development Authority Official Website 

 
Island groups of the Philippines
Islands of the Philippines